The Heritage of Arn is a sequel to The Knight Templar (Crusades trilogy) by Jan Guillou about Birger jarl, the founder of Stockholm - fictionalized to be Arn Magnusson's grandson.

The story spans across a transitional period of Scandinavia where the last remnants of the Viking traditions are replaced by continental medieval customs and the Swedes and Geats unite under the hard rule of Birger "Jarl" Magnusson. The novel, based on Swedish history and legends, starts Birger as a young man who has just lost his father Magnus and grandfather Arn Magnusson. Under the eyes of his formidable mother, Ingrid Ylva, he is groomed into a fully fledged general and statesman. Cunning in war, finance, politics and theology, he slowly seizes power over the country, annexes Finland as part of Sweden and eliminates all pretenders to the throne in favour of his own son. Thus concluding the work of making Sweden one single nation.

See also 
 The Knight Templar (Crusades trilogy)
 The Road to Jerusalem (1998),  the first book in the series
 The Knight Templar (1999),  the second book in the series
 The Kingdom at the End of the Road (2000),  the third book in the series

2001 novels
Novels by Jan Guillou
Historical novels
Novels set in Sweden